Disappearance is a 2002 television film that first aired on TBS and later was released on DVD.

Plot
While driving through New Mexico, the Henley family – Jim, his wife Patty, their daughter Kate, son Matt, along with Matt's friend Ethan – discover the whereabouts of Weaver, a ghost town, and decide to take a detour to it to take pictures. Stopping at a diner in the neighboring town of Two Wells, the family asks about Weaver but the patrons, all seeming dazed, claim not to have heard of the town, although a gas station attendant warns Jim to "stay on the pavement". The Henleys make their way to Weaver, where they find a wall with a mysterious symbol and a human-sized dried skin. They discover a videotape which shows previous visitors being taken by an unseen force, and then ending with a girl running from the unknown threat. Unnerved, the family try to leave but the SUV battery is dead and they are forced to spend the night in one of the abandoned buildings.

The next morning, the family discovers their SUV missing, along with a flashlight and Jim's sweater. Deciding to split up, Kate, Patty, and Matt remain in the building while Jim and Ethan set out for the diner. The two discover a large expanse of glass in the middle of the desert, a plaque in the center revealing it to be a 1948 neutron bomb test site called "Ground Zero". Ethan walks just ahead of Jim over a ridge, and when Jim makes his way over the ridge, Ethan is nowhere to be seen. Jim glimpses a car graveyard in the distance. He rushes there, hoping to find Ethan but instead discovers his SUV parked with other cars in the same pattern as the symbol on the wall.

Back in Weaver, Patty, away from the others to use the bathroom, senses something watching her, then falls through rotten boards into a mine shaft. She hears growling sounds from below, and climbs further up, discovering many discarded items including her husband's sweater. Matt and Kate search for their mother and Matt climbs down the mine to help her. The source of the growling rushes in the dark toward Patty and Matt. Patty fires a gun toward the sound which stops, although no body is discovered and it is uncertain if it was even harmed.

In the vehicle graveyard, as Jim salvages a battery for his SUV from another vehicle, he is stalked by one or more unseen creatures. He manages to evade them and successfully puts a replacement battery in, driving back to Weaver. He rescues his family, only for a seemingly driverless school bus and truck to block their way, forcing Jim to drive them both through a clapboard outbuilding to escape. They stop to use a telephone at the diner, but it is useless. Jim and Matt spot a dust cloud moving in their direction from the vicinity of Weaver.

Jim visits Sheriff Richards in the nearby town of Two Wells, telling him about Ethan's disappearance, the town of Weaver, where the townspeople vanished without a trace, and the unseen beings attacking them. Richards denies all knowledge of the town, but while he is away, Jim is pulled aside by an old inmate named Lester who says the town does exist and the unseen force is possibly the mutated, deformed offspring of the townspeople who refused evacuation before the bomb was dropped or the spirits of Indians interred in a burial ground under the town or even Area 51, although he doesn't believe aliens are not necessarily the explanation for the unseen forces in Weaver. It's unclear if any of this is true or simply the ramblings of a madman.

Kate finds the girl from the video alive and working at the local Dairy Queen. When she returns with the rest of the family, the girl is nowhere to be seen and she told that she's "gone off-shift." The sheriff agrees to search for Ethan the next day. The family stays in a motel, but when Kate senses one of the beings watching them from the window, the family decides to leave at once. Meanwhile, Sheriff Richards takes the inmate Lester to the desert, lights a fire, and leaves him for "the beings".

As the Henleys attempt to flee, they are stopped by Sheriff Richards who tells them that he found Ethan. The four of them pick up Ethan from the Sheriff's, Jim noticing Lester's empty cell. As the five of them drive off, Ethan tells them he fell and does not remember anything else, while Matt questions the events. As Jim is distracted, the car hits an unseen creature, causing the SUV to flip over. The viewpoint of one of the unseen creatures makes its way to the wrecked car, and the Henleys are heard screaming.

Six months later, Jim is now the gas-station attendant, while Patty works as a waitress in the diner, all of them in the same dazed state as the other members of the town of Two Wells.  After Kate has served Sheriff Richards at the diner, the film ends with Kate feeding one of the crows as several bikers turn up at the diner, very possibly to begin the cycle all over again.

Cast
 Jim Henley – Harry Hamlin
 Patty Henley – Susan Dey
 Matt Henley – Jeremy Lelliott
 Kate Henley – Basia A'Hern
 Ethan – Jamie Croft
 Sheriff Richards – Jeremy Kewley
 Lester – Roger Newcombe
 Lisa – Victoria Dixon-Whittle
 Tammy – Annie Carter
 Old Man – Ian Boyce
 Assistant Deputy – Robert MacPherson
 Ice-Cream Waitress – Nikki Fort
 Steve – Christopher James Taylor
 Rachel – Charlotte Rees
 Brian – Paul Reichstein
 Bill the Cook – Dominic Pedlar
 Biker (1) – Claude Revi
 Biker (2) – Clive Cunningham
 BackPacker  - Stephen Marriott (Jr.)

Production
Both Disappearance and Night Gallery were tagged with "Eerie". Filming took place in South Australia around various locations.

Broadcast and DVD release
Disappearance was first broadcast in the United States on TBS on April 21, 2002. It was later released on DVD on January 21, 2003.

References

External links
 

2002 television films
2002 films
American television films
Australian television films
2002 horror films
TBS original films
Films set in ghost towns
Films set in New Mexico
Films shot in South Australia
Films shot in Flinders Ranges
2000s English-language films